The siege of Perekop  on June 17, 1736, was part of  the Russo-Turkish War (1735–1739). Russian field marshal Burkhard Christoph von Münnich (known in Russia as Minikh) successfully stormed the fortifications at the Isthmus of Perekop and left the Tatar fortress Fortress Or Qapi (known as Perekop Fortress in Russian) in ruins. This was a serious, if not mortal, blow to the independence of the Crimean Khanate and left the Tatar fortress in ruins. As a result, the Russian Empire for the first time gained access into the Crimean Peninsula. This was a serious blow to the independence of the Crimean Khanate.

Minikh feigned a false attack on the right flank, and the major attack on the fight flank broke through the fortifications. The army proceeded to the capital of the Khanate, Bakhchisaray, and Akmescit (now Simferopol). However epidemic, epizooty, and mutiny in the army forced Minikh to leave Crimea.

References

Military operations involving the Crimean Khanate
1736 in the Russian Empire
Conflicts in 1736
1736 in the Ottoman Empire
Russo-Turkish War (1735–1739)
Perekop (1736)
Perekop (1736)